West Lesbos, sometimes also referred to as West Lesvos, is a municipality on the island of Lesbos in the North Aegean region in Greece. The municipality was formed from a decision by the Ministry of the Interior, published on 9 March 2019, which divided the pre-existing municipality of Lesbos. The seat of the municipality is in Kalloni.

The municipality encompasses 36 towns and villages in a total area of 1,072 square kilometers.

The economy of the Municipality of West Lesbos is 90% dependent on agriculture and tourism, mainly olive production, stock-farming, fishing, tourism, geothermy and other renewable energy sources. 

Molyvos, Eresos (as well as its sister beach Skala Eresou), Petra & Vatera are the major tourism hot spots in the summer. 

The municipality's first mayor, who currently still serves in the position, is Taxiarchis Verros

Municipal Units 

The municipality consists of the following seven subdivisions:

Mayors

References

External links

Official West Lesbos Municipality Website

Municipalities of the North Aegean
Populated places in Lesbos
2019 establishments in Greece